Trace may refer to:

Arts and entertainment

Music
 Trace (Son Volt album), 1995
 Trace (Died Pretty album), 1993
 Trace (band), a Dutch progressive rock band
 The Trace (album)

Other uses in arts and entertainment
 Trace (magazine), British hip-hop magazine
 Trace (manhwa), a Korean internet cartoon
 Trace (novel), a novel by Patricia Cornwell
 The Trace (film), a 1994 Turkish film
 The Trace (video game), 2015 video game
 Sama (film), alternate title The Trace, a 1988 Tunisian film
 Trace, a fictional character in the game Metroid Prime Hunters
 Trace, the protagonist of Axiom Verge
 Trace, another name for Portgas D. Ace, a fictional character in the manga One Piece
 TRACE, the main brand for a number of music channels such as Trace Urban

Language
 Trace (deconstruction), a concept in Derridian deconstruction
 Trace (linguistics), a syntactic placeholder resulting from a transformation
 TRACE (psycholinguistics), a psycholinguistic model of speech perception
 Trace (semiology), the history carried by a sign
 Sign-trace, a detectable amount conceived of by Béatrice Galinon-Mélénec

Mathematics, science, and technology

Computing and electronics
 TRACE, a request method in the HTTP protocol
 Traces, the equivalence classes of strings of a trace monoid, studied in trace theories of concurrent computation
 Digital traces, the traces of activities and behaviours that people leave when they interact in digital environments
 Packet trace, a timestamped sequence of packets captured on a computer network with a sniffer or similar tools
 Signal trace, a printed or etched wire on a printed circuit board
 Stack trace, report of the active steps of a computer program's execution
 Trace cache, a specialized CPU cache to speed up executable instruction fetch

Mathematics
 Trace (linear algebra), the sum of the elements on the main diagonal of a square matrix or a linear transformation
 Field trace, a particular trace in field theory
 Trace class, a certain set of operators in a Hilbert space
 Trace operator, a restriction-to-boundary operator in a Sobolev space

Physical sciences
 TRACE (Transition Region and Coronal Explorer), a NASA satellite
 Trace element, in geochemistry, an element which composes less than 0.1% of a sample
 Trace evidence, material found at a crime scene
 Trace fossil, fossil record of biological activity
 Trace radioisotope, an element that is found in small quantities because it undergoes radioactive decay
 Seismic trace, in seismology, record of ground movement from a seismograph
 Trace (precipitation), in earth science, an amount of precipitation that falls that is too small to be measured with standard units

Places
 Trace, West Virginia
 The Trace (Land Between the Lakes), a scenic roadway in Kentucky and Tennessee
 Trace Creek (Castor River), a stream in Missouri
 Trace Creek (Cub Creek), a stream in Missouri
 Trace Creek (Twelvemile Creek), a stream in Missouri
 Trace Lake, a lake in Minnesota

Other uses
 Trace (name), a given name, nickname, and surname
 A synonym for trail, as in Natchez Trace
 Trace (tack), part of a draft animal's gear
 Track and trace, in goods distribution and logistics
 Trace, a type of eyeblink conditioning
 An Italian-derived synonym for star fort, in fortification
 Trade reporting and compliance engine, in the U.S. financial markets, a reporting system for US bond transactions administered by the FINRA
 The Trace (website), a website covering gun issues in the United States

See also
 Traceability
 Tracer (disambiguation)
 Tracing (disambiguation)
 Tracking (disambiguation)
 DTrace
 Human-Trace (Ichnos-Anthropos)